Eugene Wesley "Gene" Roddenberry (August 19, 1921 – October 24, 1991) was an American screenwriter and producer of several television series, best known for his work in creating the Star Trek franchise. He began a writing career while he was a Sergeant in the Los Angeles Police Department (LAPD) and his first work to be bought by a network was The Secret Defense of 117, although it took four years to be broadcast. During that time, he wrote four episodes of the police procedural Highway Patrol under the pseudonym "Robert Wesley", as the LAPD required employees to seek formal permission to work a second job. After leaving the force, he wrote for several series, such as Have Gun – Will Travel but wanted to become a producer.

He wrote pilots for a series of his own, but these were turned down by the studios until he began work on The Lieutenant. This ran for a single season on NBC on Saturday nights. While involved in that series, he began working on a science fiction premise that became Star Trek. He oversaw the production of the series for the first two seasons, but following budget cuts and the move to an unfavorable timeslot for the third season, he stepped back from working on Star Trek but remained credited as an executive producer. Following the cancellation of the series, he wrote and produced his first feature film, Pretty Maids All in a Row. He also produced several new science fiction pilots: Genesis II (also re-worked into a second pilot, called Planet Earth), The Questor Tapes and Spectre. Of these, Questor was approved to go to a full season, but following disagreements between Roddenberry and the studio over suggested changes, it was canceled.

Star Trek was resurrected twice, first as an animated series, and then as Star Trek: The Motion Picture. The studio brought in a new producer for the sequel to the film, to which Roddenberry demanded creative control or else he would refuse an executive producer credit, instead only willing to be credited as creative consultant. This credit started with Star Trek II: The Wrath of Khan and continued through to Star Trek VI: The Undiscovered Country. He took Star Trek back to television during the late 1980s, with Star Trek: The Next Generation. In order to maintain complete control, he decided to release the series directly into broadcast syndication in order to avoid the interference of networks. Following his death in 1991, two of his 1970s science fiction ideas were re-worked, resulting in Earth: Final Conflict and Andromeda.

Films

Television

Annotations

References

Sources

External links

 

American filmographies
Filmography